Andrea Goldsmith (born 1950) is an Australian writer and novelist.

Life
Goldsmith was born in Melbourne, Victoria, to an Australian-Jewish family. She started learning the piano as a young child, and music remains an abiding passion. She initially trained as a speech pathologist and worked for several years with children suffering from severe communication impairment until becoming a full-time writer in the late 1980s. From 1987 and through the 1990s she taught creative writing at Deakin University, and she continues to conduct workshops and mentor new novelists.

She travels widely, and London, in particular, figures prominently in her novels. At the same time, she describes herself as 'a deeply Melbourne person'.

Goldsmith lives in Clifton Hill, in Melbourne's inner suburbs, in a house she bought with her partner, the poet Dorothy Porter. She continued to live there following Porter's death in 2008.

Literary career

Andrea Goldsmith has published eight novels. Rich in ideas and characterisation, they tell of contemporary life in all its diversity. Narratives of ambition, love, family, art, music and relationships abound in her books.

She also writes literary essays on topics as diverse as Oliver Sacks ('Oliver Sacks: Anthropologist of Mind'), nuclear physics and life-threatening illness ('Chain Reaction') and Jewish-Australian identity ('Talmudic Excursions'). She is a lively and dramatic performer of her work and reads regularly at venues throughout Australia. She was a lecturer in creative writing at Deakin University in Melbourne (1995-8) and while as a writer-in-residence at La Trobe University she edited an anthology written by a group of people with gambling problems, called Calling A Spade A Spade. She conducts workshops and short courses for writers of fiction, and she mentors new novelists.

She has been a guest at all the major literary festivals in Australia, and appeared at the 2009 Sydney Writers' Festival.

Awards

 1993 — NBC Banjo Awards, NBC Lysbeth Cohen Memorial Prize Modern Interiors, shortlisted
 2003 — Miles Franklin Award The Prosperous Thief, shortlisted 2003

Bibliography

Novels
 Gracious Living (Penguin, 1990)
 Modern Interiors (Penguin, 1991)
 Facing the Music (Penguin, 1994)
 Under the Knife (Penguin, 1998)
 The Prosperous Thief (Allen&Unwin, 2002)
 Reunion (HarperCollins, 2009)
 The Memory Trap (Fourth Estate, 2013)
 Invented Lives (Scribe, 2019)

References

External links

1950 births
Living people
Australian women novelists
Lesbian novelists
Australian LGBT novelists
20th-century Australian novelists
21st-century Australian novelists
20th-century Australian women writers
21st-century Australian women writers
Jewish Australian writers
Jewish novelists
LGBT Jews
Writers from Melbourne
Academic staff of Deakin University
21st-century LGBT people